Wipe or wiping may refer to:

Hygiene
 Toilet paper or wet wipes, or their use

Arts and media
 Wipe (transition), a gradual transition in film editing
 Wipe curtain, a kind of theater curtain
 Wipe or Screenwipe, a television series by Charlie Brooker

Technology
 Wiping, a process in which old television and radio recordings were overwritten, erased, or destroyed
 Data erasure, purging a computer file to counter data remanence
 Degaussing of ships' hulls to guard against magnetic naval mines

Other uses
 Wuhan Institute of Physical Education (WIPE), a university in China

See also
 Wiped joint, a form of soldered joint used to join lead pipework